Nuestra Señora de las Fuentes is a Carthusian monastery in Sariñena, province of Huesca, Aragon, Spain.

Built in Baroque style, it is characterized by a large series of religious paintings in its interior. It was founded in 1507 by the counts of Sástago.

The interior walls were decorated from 1770 to 1780 by Manuel Bayeu, including a total of 250 frescoes featuring brilliant colors. The paintings depict scenes from the Gospels and lives of saints, apostles and other religious themes.

See also
Catholic Church in Spain

Notes

16th-century Roman Catholic church buildings in Spain
18th-century Roman Catholic church buildings in Spain
Roman Catholic churches completed in 1507
Baroque architecture in Aragon
Churches in Aragon